Benue North-East senatorial District well known as zone A within Benue State covers seven local government areas which include Katsina-Ala, Logo, Ukum, Konshisha, Vandeikya, Kwande and Ushongo. There 84 electoral wards and 1,389 polling units as of 2019 election. The headquarter of Benue North-East Senatorial District is Katsina-ALa. The current representative is Senator Gabriel Suswam.

List of senators representing Benue North-East

References 

Politics of Benue State
Senatorial districts in Nigeria